Botswana national football team results may refer to:
Botswana national football team results (1968 to 1999)
Botswana national football team results (2000 to 2019)
Botswana national football team results (2020 to present)